Molly was launched at Liverpool in 1770. Between 1777 and 1779 she made three voyages to the British northern whale fishery. Afterwards, she sailed as a West Indiaman. From 1779 she sailed under a letter of marque, and captured one prize. Around the end of 1781 she engaged in a single ship action in which her captain was killed. She was captured but her captor gave her up. She was last listed in 1783.

Career
Molly was first listed in an online volume of Lloyd's Register (LR) in 1776.

Molly became a whaler in the British northern whale fishery. She made two voyages to Greenland and one to Davis Strait.

New owners returned Molly to merchant trade. Captain John Jordan acquired a letter of marque on 7 August 1779. In March 1780 Lloyd's List reported that Molly, Jordan, master, had arrived at Antigua with a prize. From Jamaica Molly sailed to Georgia, and Charleston, South Carolina.

Lloyd's List reported in January 1782 that Molly, Jordain (or Jordan), master had been on her way to Liverpool from Jamaica when she encountered the privateer Terror of England, of 22 guns, Captain Kelly, off the Tuskar Rock, Ireland. After an engagement of three hours Molly struck. Captain Jordain and four of his crew had been killed, and several men had been wounded. However, a gale came up and the prize crew, whom Kelly had put on board Molly, not knowing what to do with her, delivered her up to her own crew, who had been left on board. They then took her into Greenock. From Greenock her crew took her to Liverpool.

Fate
Molly was last listed in 1783.

Notes

Citations

References
 

1779 ships
Age of Sail merchant ships of England
Captured ships
Whaling ships